Liesching is a surname. Notable people with the surname include: 

Carla Liesching (born 1985), South African artist
Percivale Liesching (1895–1973), British civil servant
Theodor Gottfried Liesching (1865–1922), German jurist and politician